John de Carrick (died c. 1380), a native of Carrick, Scotland, was a 14th-century Chancellor of Scotland and Bishop-elect of Dunkeld. Although John's exact origins are obscure, he seems to have come from a branch of the old native comital family of Carrick. Later evidence suggests he was a graduate of canon law, but the university is not known.

He was Chancellor of the diocese of Glasgow by the early 1360s, during the episcopate of William Rae (1339–1367), and held Moffat parish church in Annandale as a prebend. In political circles, he was associated with Archbald the Grim, Lord of Galloway; perhaps with the latter's assistance, he rose in royal service during the 1360s, as Clerk of the Wardrobe, Keeper of the Privy Seal and then in 1370 Chancellor of Scotland. Despite the death of David II of Scotland and accession of Robert II of Scotland in 1371, John remained Chancellor.

In 1370 he was given the royal nomination to fill the vacant see of Dunkeld, which was free because of the death of John Luce that year. He failed, however, to secure papal approval, and the Pope instead provided Michael de Monymusk to the Bishopric. Carrick continued in royal service until 1377, after which it appears he was allowed to retire on the revenues of the burgh of Lanark. His death can probably be placed in 1380.

References
Dowden, John, The Bishops of Scotland, ed. J. Maitland Thomson, (Glasgow, 1912)
MacQueen, Hector L., "Carrick, John (d. 1380/81)", in the Oxford Dictionary of National Biography, Oxford University Press, 2004 , accessed 19 Feb 2007
Watt, D.E.R., Fasti Ecclesiae Scotinanae Medii Aevi ad annum 1638, 2nd Draft, (St Andrews, 1969)

14th-century births
1380 deaths
Bishops of Dunkeld (non consecrated, titular or doubtful)
Lord chancellors of Scotland
Medieval Gaels from Scotland
People from South Ayrshire